Yan Xiandong (born 5 March 1973) is a Chinese fencer. He competed in the individual sabre event at the 1996 Summer Olympics.

References

External links
 

1973 births
Living people
Chinese male sabre fencers
Olympic fencers of China
Fencers at the 1996 Summer Olympics